Facundo Bagnis and Diego Junqueira won the final 6–1, 6–2 against Ariel Behar and Guillermo Durán.

Seeds

Draw

Draw

References
 Main Draw

Copa Agco Cordoba - Doubles
2012 Doubles